The Society of Hospital Pharmacists of Australia (SHPA) is a professional association. 
Membership mostly comprises hospital pharmacists, but is open to pharmacy technicians and pharmacy students. The organisation aims to support and provide professional development to its members and be an advocate for improved medicines management in policy and practice. The society also produces various publications, including the Journal of Pharmacy Practice and Research (JPPR).

Formation 

The Society of Hospital Pharmacists Australia was founded in Victoria, Australia in 1941. The society's inaugural committee members include Fred J. Boyd and Charles B Macgibbon. The organisation began its first two decades as a Victorian organisation. Following the inclusion of other state branches, the SHPA  became a national body in 1961.

Structure 

The SHPA is supported by branches, as well as committees of specialty practice. The  Melbourne based secretariat, maintains the society's administrative services as directed by the member elected board. As of 2014, the society had 3268 members.

Awards

Glaxo Medal of Merit
Annually for outstanding service to Australian hospital pharmacy:
 1962 to 1971 known as the Evans Medal for Merit
 1975 known as The Allen and Hanbury's Medal of Merit
 1980 known as the Glaxo Medal of Merit.

Recipients:

 Fred J. Boyd, 1962
 Charles B. Macgibbon, 1963
 Bill Hayes, 1965
 Lance Jeffs, 1965
 Mavis Sweeney, 1968
 Edward (Nikk) J Phelan, 1969
 Barrie R. Miller, 1970
 Neil Naismith, 1975
 Michael Wyer, 1977
Frank Ryan, 1979
 Bill Thomson, 1981
 Richard J. Plumridge, 1988

Fred J. Boyd Award
Biennially for outstanding contribution to Australian hospital pharmacy:

Recipients:

 Neil Naismith, 1982
 Bill Thomson, 2011

See also 
 Other Australian Pharmaceutical organisations

References

External links 
 The Society of Hospital Pharmacists of Australia
 The Journal of Pharmacy Practice and Research

Pharmacy organisations in Australia
Organizations established in 1941